Juan Molina (born March 17, 1965), better known as John John Molina in the world of boxing, is a former boxer whose career transcended boxing in Puerto Rico. A multiple time world champion, this boxer was also known as quite a socialite. Molina is a native of Fajardo, Puerto Rico.

Amateur career
Molina represented Puerto Rico as a Bantamweight at the 1984 Los Angeles Olympic Games. His results were:
1st round bye
Defeated Jarmo Eskelinen (Finland) 5-0
Lost to Pedro Nolasco (Dominican Republic) 2-3

Molina won the Boxing World Cup in Seoul, South Korea, November 1985, by knocking out Kelcie Banks in the finals. Upon returning to Puerto Rico, the 20-year-old youngster announced to Rafael Bracero on TV he would be ready to fight professional world Featherweight champion Victor Luvi Callejas within a year. That wasn't to happen, however.

Pro career
Molina started as a professional on February 25, 1986, beating Job Walters by a decision in four. His first three fights were decisions. He won his first 14 bouts, nine of them by knockout. Among the people he beat during that span was Victor Aponte, who was a stablemate of both Alberto Mercado and Juan Carazo. Aponte got knocked out by Molina in the 10th and final round. During this period of his career, Molina received much television exposure in Puerto Rico, many of his fights being shown on TV by producer and fight commentator Ivonne Class and her Video Deportes company.

Then, he faced Lupe Suarez, losing for the first time, when he was knocked out in the ninth round. Immediately after suffering his first loss, he embarked on a five-fight win streak, including a disqualification win in four rounds over former Hector Camacho world title challenger Rafael Solis, and a knockout in eight over Miguel Medina. After those two wins, he was ranked as the number one challenger by the IBF.

On October 27, 1988, Molina was at The Arco Arena in Sacramento, to challenge the IBF super featherweight champion Tony Lopez, in what marked the beginning of a three-fight rivalry between Molina and Lopez. Molina dropped Lopez in round two, but Lopez went on to retain the title by a split decision.

In his next fight, April 29, 1989, the WBO put him and former WBC featherweight champion Juan Laporte against each other for the vacant WBO super featherweight  title. Molina became a world champion by beating Laporte by a 12-round unanimous decision at Roberto Clemente Coliseum in San Juan. Then, in September of that year, he returned to Arco Arena to resume his rivalry with Lopez. Molina added the IBF belt to his WBO crown by knocking Lopez out in the tenth round.

On January 28, 1990, he avenged his loss to Suarez by knocking him out in the sixth round to retain the belt, but then, on May 20 of that year, he and Lopez met for their rubber match, this time in Reno. Lopez dropped Molina and won a unanimous decision to recover his status as world Jr. Lightweight champion.

Between then and 1992, Molina won five straight fights, four by knockout. And so, after Brian Mitchell (who had beaten Lopez), left the IBF title vacant due to retirement, Molina travelled to South Africa, where he met Jackie Gunguzula for the vacant world title. He knocked Gunguzula out in the fourth round to become world champion once again, and, days later, he was the object of a large welcoming at Luis Muñoz Marín International Airport in San Juan. During this period of his reign, Molina made seven defenses, beating challengers like Bernard Taylor, Floyd Havard, Wilson Rodriguez, former world Featherweight champion Gregorio Vargas and future world Featherweight champion Manuel "Mantecas" Medina, among others.

Around then, he became quite known by the mainstream Puerto Rican public, becoming one of the first boxers ever to be portrayed on the cover of Vea magazine, and dating a famous model.

Molina then moved up in weight to challenge the WBO lightweight champion Oscar De La Hoya, losing by a unanimous decision in 12 rounds in an HBO Boxing televised event.

After that, Molina engaged in a series of fights against mostly lower-level opposition for the next two years, and he grew frustrated over the fact that his opposition level was being downgraded by promoters after the fight with de la Hoya. He won his next nine bouts, but the only two opponents that can probably be called respectable names in his list of opponents during that span were Jaime "Rocky" Balboa, beaten by decision in ten, and Isaac Cruz, beaten by a disqualification in four.

On May 9, 1998, Molina was given a second chance at a world lightweight championship, when he met IBF champion Sugar Shane Mosley, in Molina's second HBO fight. Mosley retained the title by a knockout in the eighth round, and Molina went back to the super featherweight division.

His next fight was also for the world title, but he had to wait nine months for that fight. In February 1999, he faced IBF super featherweight champion Robert Garcia, dropping the champion in their pay per view event but losing a 12-round decision in what turned out to be his last world title fight.

Molina wasn't done with boxing, and he went on to win seven more fights in a row, including two decision wins that were televised by the USA Network: over Emanuel Burton and future Kostya Tszyu world title challenger Ben Tackie.

His last fight was a T.K.O. loss to Mexican Juan Lazcano, Molina retired from boxing after the fight.

See also

List of Puerto Ricans
List of Puerto Rican boxing world champions
List of super-featherweight boxing champions

References

1965 births
Living people
Boxers at the 1984 Summer Olympics
Olympic boxers of Puerto Rico
Super-featherweight boxers
Lightweight boxers
World super-featherweight boxing champions
International Boxing Federation champions
World Boxing Organization champions
People from Fajardo, Puerto Rico
Puerto Rican male boxers